The Erik Buell Racing 1190RS is a sport bike that is manufactured by Erik Buell Racing in the United States. It was introduced in June 2011 for the 2012 model year. Only 100 units were planned for 2011 production.

Awards
2011:
Cycle World's Best Superbike
Motorcyclist magazine's Best Dreambike

References

External links
 Official site 

Motorcycle racing
Sport bikes